Lawrencetown may refer to:

Lawrencetown, County Down, Northern Ireland
Lawrencetown, County Galway, Ireland 
 Lawrencetown, Annapolis County, Nova Scotia, Canada
 Lawrencetown, Halifax County, Nova Scotia, Canada
East Lawrencetown, Nova Scotia
West Lawrencetown, Nova Scotia
Upper Lawrencetown, Nova Scotia